Pusulpitiya Raja Maha Vihara (පුසුල්පිටිය රජ මහා විහාරය) is an ancient Buddhist temple which is located in Pusulpitiya village, Nuwara Eliya District, Sri Lanka. It is situated in Kotmale about 3 miles from Morape on the banks of the Kotmale Oya. Currently this temple has been recognized as an archaeological protected site in Sri Lanka.

This temple is believed to be where Prince Dutugemunu spent his childhood when Elara was ruling Anuradhapura. Pusulpitiya Vihara is also said to have one of the four valuable Dambaran Buddha statues which has been brought to Sri Lanka from India by Arahat Maliyadeva.

History

The history of this temple is dated back to the 3rd century or before. The bo tree at the temple has been planted in the period of King Devanampiya tissa.

Legends
According to the legend, an Indian Brahmin who has come to Sri Lanka after heard about a golden ash pumpkin in Nain Kelina Thota in Kotmale area. To obtain that golden ash pumpkin he married a village girl from that area and gave a birth to a son. When the suitable time is reached, he scarified his son and obtained the pumpkin. While running with it, he kept the pumpkin on a rocky plain to get little rest. It is said that the golden ash pumpkin was dipped into the rock. Due to this incident, the area was known as Pusulpitiya and it is believed that the Pusulpitiya Rajamaha Vihara was constructed on the ground where the Golden ash pumpkin was dipped into the rock.

Tooth Relic of the Buddha 
According to the chronicles Pusulpitiya Rajamaha Vihara has given refuge for Sacred Tooth Relic of Buddha for three times during the times of political unrest.

References

Buddhist temples in Nuwara Eliya District
Stupas in Sri Lanka
Archaeological protected monuments in Nuwara Eliya District
Geography of Nuwara Eliya District